The Pan Pacific Para Swimming Championships is an international para swimming event first held in 2011. Like its able-bodied counterpart, the Pan Pacific Swimming Championships, the meet is staged to allow for an international championship-level meet in the non-Paralympic and non-World Championship years.

History
Like the Pan Pacific Swimming Championships, the meet was founded by its four Charter nations: Australia, Canada, Japan, and the United States. As part of the Charter, hosting of the meet is to rotate among these four nations, with the exception to the requirement of the meet being held in Japan every other championship. As of 2018, Japan has yet to host the meet. 

Due to the presence of swimming power-house nationals like the United States and Australia, it is regularly used as a staging meet for the Paralympics and World Championships.

List of championships

Medal table (2011–2018)
2011 Pan Pacific Para Swimming Championships medal table

2014 Pan Pacific Para Swimming Championships medal table

2018 Pan Pacific Para Swimming Championships medal table (Updated after 2018 Championships)

References 

International swimming competitions
Swimming competitions in Oceania
Recurring sporting events established in 2011